A tidal island is a piece of land that is connected to the mainland by a natural or man-made causeway that is exposed at low tide and submerged at high tide. Because of the mystique surrounding tidal islands, many of them have been sites of religious worship, such as Mont-Saint-Michel with its Benedictine Abbey.  Tidal islands are also commonly the sites of fortresses because of their natural fortifications.

List of tidal islands

Asia

Hong Kong
 Ma Shi Chau in Tai Po District, northeastern New Territories, within the Tolo Harbour
Kiu Tau Island in Sai Kung

Iran
 Naaz islands in Persian gulf, southern seashore of Qeshm island

Japan
 Enoshima, in Sagami Bay, Kanagawa Prefecture

Taiwan
 Kueibishan in Penghu
 Jiangong Islet in Kinmen

South Korea
Jindo Island and Modo Island in southwest South Korea
Jebudo in the west

Europe

Denmark
 Mandø Island – on Denmark's western coast
 Knudshoved Island – north of Vordingborg on southern Zealand, Denmark

Denmark/Germany 
 The Halligen in the North Frisian Islands, Denmark/Germany

France

Île Aganton in Brittany
Île Madame in Charente-Maritime
Île de Noirmoutier in Vendée
Mont Saint-Michel in Normandy
Tombelaine in Normandy

Germany 
 The Neuwerk in the Wadden Sea

Guernsey 
 Lihou in Guernsey, one of the Channel Islands

Iceland
Grótta in Seltjarnarnes, the Capital Region

Ireland
 Coney Island near Rosses Point, County Sligo
 Omey Island in Connemara, County Galway
 Inishkeel, County Donegal

Italy 
 Isola Grande, Sicily

Jersey 
 Elizabeth Castle in Jersey, a castle off the south coast accessible on foot at low tide
 Saint Aubin's Fort
 La Corbière Lighthouse
 La Motte, Jersey, alias Green Island
 L'Avarison, which hosts Seymour Tower
 Archirondel Tower, now connected via permanent causeway
 Icho Tower
 Portelet Tower

Spain
 Cortegada Island in Pontevedra coast, Galicia.
 San Nikolas Island in Lekeitio, Bizkaia

United Kingdom

England
Asparagus Island, Mount's Bay, Cornwall
Burgh Island, Devon
Burrow Island, Portsmouth Harbour
Chapel Island, Cumbria
Chiswick Eyot in the River Thames in London
Gugh in the Isles of Scilly (joined to St Agnes at low tide)
Hilbre Island, Middle Eye and Little Eye in the River Dee estuary, between North Wales and the English Wirral, but administratively in England.
Horsey Island, Essex
Lindisfarne, Northumberland
Mersea Island, Essex (accessible to road traffic via the Strood)
Northey Island, Essex
Osea Island, Essex
Piel Island, Cumbria
Scolt Head Island, Norfolk
Sheep Island, Cumbria (joined at low tide to Piel Island and to Walney Island)
St Mary's Island, North Tyneside
St Michael's Mount, Cornwall
White Island, Isles of Scilly and St Martin's, Isles of Scilly

Northern Ireland

Nendrum Monastery on Mahee Island, Strangford Lough
Guns Island, near Ballyhornan

Scotland
Baleshare in the Outer Hebrides, joined to North Uist
Bernera Island, joined to Lismore
Brough of Birsay in Orkney, joined to Orkney Mainland
Castle Stalker on Loch Laich in Argyll
Cramond Island in the Firth of Forth
Island Davaar near Campbeltown, off the Kintyre peninsula
Eilean Fladday and Eilean Tigh off the Isle of Raasay
Eilean Shona in Loch Moidart, Lochaber, Highland
Eilean Tioram, in Loch Moidart
Erraid off the Isle of Mull
Hestan Island near Rough Island in Auchencairn Bay
Islands of Fleet: Ardwall Isle and Barlocco Isle in Galloway
Isle Ristol, the innermost of the Summer Isles
Kili Holm in Orkney, joined to Egilsay
Oronsay in the Inner Hebrides, joined to Colonsay
Orosay in the Outer Hebrides, joined to Barra
Rough Island opposite Rockcliffe, Dumfries & Galloway
Vallay (Bhàlaigh), joined to North Uist in the Outer Hebrides

Wales
Burry Holms off the Gower
Cribinau off Anglesey
Gateholm off the south west coast of Pembrokeshire
Ynys Llanddwyn off Anglesey
Mumbles Lighthouse located in Mumbles, near Swansea
St Catherine's Island in Pembrokeshire
Sully Island in the Vale of Glamorgan
Worm's Head at the end of the Gower
Ynys Cantwr off Ramsey Island, Pembrokeshire
Ynys Feurig off Anglesey
Ynys Gifftan in Gwynedd, north Wales
Ynys Gwelltog off Ramsey Island, Pembrokeshire
Ynys Lochtyn on the coast of Cardigan Bay

43 (unbridged) tidal islands can be walked to from the UK mainland.

North America

Canada
Finisterre Island off of Bowen Island, British Columbia, Canada
Francis Peninsula off of Sunshine Coast (British Columbia), British Columbia, Canada
Micou's Island in St. Margarets Bay, Nova Scotia, Canada
Minister's Island in New Brunswick, Canada
Ross Island and Cheney Island in Grand Manan, New Brunswick, Canada
Wedge Island, Nova Scotia, Canada
Whyte Islet in West Vancouver, British Columbia, Canada
Bird Islet in Neck Point Park, Nanaimo, British Columbia, Canada

United States

Bar Island in Maine
Battery Point Light in California
Bumpkin Island in Massachusetts
Camano Island in Puget Sound of Washington state, since earth filled
Charles Island, in Connecticut
Douglas Island in Alaska
High Island, New York
Long Point Island, Harpswell, Maine
Tskawahyah Island of Cape Alava, Washington

Oceania

Australia
 The Point Walter Sandbar in Perth, Western Australia has slowly formed into a tidal island and is only connected to the mainland in extreme low tides.
Penguin Island (Western Australia) in the Shoalwater Islands Marine Park
Former tidal island Bennelong Island in Sydney, Australia was developed into Bennelong Point and is now the location of the Sydney Opera House.

New Zealand

Matakana Island in Tauranga Harbour
Opahekeheke Island in the Kaipara Harbour
Puddingstone Island in Otago Harbour
Rabbit Island, Bells Island, and Bests Island in Tasman Bay / Te Tai-o-Aorere
The Hauraki Gulf islands of Motutapu Island and Rangitoto Island are connected at low tide
The Okatakata Islands and Walker Island in Rangaunu Harbour

See also

Island
Islet
Presque-isle
Tied island
Vanishing island

References

External links 
 

Islands by type
Islands